Oney Tapia (born 27 February 1976) is a visually impaired Italian-Cuban Paralympic athlete competing in discus throw and shot put events. He represented Italy at the 2016 Summer Paralympics in Rio de Janeiro, Brazil and he won the silver medal in the men's discus throw F11 event. He represented Italy at the 2020 Summer Paralympics in the discus throw and shot put events, winning two bronze medals.

Career 
He won the gold medal in the men's discus throw F11 event at the 2016 IPC Athletics European Championships held in Grosseto, Italy. In 2017, he participated and won that year's edition of the dancing television show Ballando con le Stelle.

In 2018, he won the gold medal in the men's discus throw F11-13 event at the Para Athletics Grand Prix in Rieti, Italy. At the 2018 World Para Athletics European Championships held in Berlin, Germany, he won the gold medals in both the men's shot put F11 and men's discus throw F11 events. In the discus throw event, he set a new world record of 46.07 m. In 2019, he won the silver medal in the men's discus throw F11 event at the World Para Athletics Championships held in Dubai, United Arab Emirates.

See also
 Italy at the Summer Paralympics (2016, 2020)

References

External links
 

Living people
1976 births
Athletes from Havana
Italian male discus throwers
Italian male shot putters
Paralympic athletes of Italy
Visually impaired discus throwers
Visually impaired shot putters
Paralympic discus throwers
Paralympic shot putters
Athletes (track and field) at the 2016 Summer Paralympics
Athletes (track and field) at the 2020 Summer Paralympics
Medalists at the 2016 Summer Paralympics
Medalists at the 2020 Summer Paralympics
Paralympic medalists in athletics (track and field)
Paralympic silver medalists for Italy
Paralympic bronze medalists for Italy
Reality show winners